Samuel Danks Waddy (27 June 1830 – 30 December 1902) was an English politician.

He was born in Gateshead, the son of Samuel Dousland Waddy, a Methodist minister. The family soon moved to Sheffield and his father was instrumental in the founding of Wesley College in 1838 (and was Governor of the school from 1844 to 1862). Samuel Danks Waddy attended Wesley College himself and was the first pupil to be registered in 1838. He graduated with a BA from London University in 1850, and was called to the Bar at the Inner Temple in 1858. He became a King's Counsel (KC) in 1874, and became a bencher of his Inn two years later.

Waddy was elected as the Liberal Member of Parliament (MP) for Barnstaple, Devon on 3 February 1874 but resigned this seat in December 1879 to stand in a by-election in the Sheffield constituency, taking the seat on 21 December 1879. However he held the Sheffield seat for less than four months, being voted out by just 40 votes on 3 April 1880.

He was elected as MP for Edinburgh in 1882, and when that seat was abolished, he contested, but lost, the new Islington North seat at the 1885 general election.

On 7 July 1886, at the 1886 general election, he was elected as M.P. for the Brigg constituency in Lincolnshire. He held the seat until 1894 when he was appointed Recorder of Sheffield. He kept this position until he resigned shortly before his death, in late 1902.

In 1896 he was appointed as Judge of the Cheshire County Court but only held the position for two weeks, transferring to be Judge of the Sheffield County Court on 24 April 1896.

Waddy married Emma Garbutt, from Hull, who died in 1889. He died in Islington, London on 30 December 1902, aged 72.

References

Stainton, J.H. (1924). The Storm of Politics. In The Making of Sheffield, 1865-1914, chapter 4. Sheffield: E. Weston & Sons. (This book is out of print but an OCR'd version is available online.)
Gummer, G. (1927). Reminiscences of Rotherham: A Retrospect of over 60 years, pp. 106–108. Rotherham: H Garnett and Company Limited. (This book is out of print but a transcription is available online.)
"." Leigh Rayments Peerage Page. Accessed on 20 June 2005.

External links 
 
 
 

1830 births
1902 deaths
Liberal Party (UK) MPs for English constituencies
Scottish Liberal Party MPs
Members of the Parliament of the United Kingdom for Edinburgh constituencies
People from Gateshead
Politicians from Tyne and Wear
Politics of Sheffield
UK MPs 1874–1880
UK MPs 1880–1885
UK MPs 1886–1892
UK MPs 1892–1895
People educated at Wesley College, Sheffield
Members of the Parliament of the United Kingdom for Barnstaple